Greg Sims is an American entertainment executive, film producer, and writer, best known for his work in independent film and in giving early opportunities to major talent.

Biography
One of his earliest works was the critically acclaimed 1987 comedy/horror/spoof Return to Horror High, which also served as a vehicle for the young George Clooney, who later acted in what would be his first leading feature film role in the Sims-produced Red Surf (1990). Though he produced numerous films following this, he returned to also writing them with The Fear in 1995 and Touch Me (1997) *Touch Me provided early starring roles for actors Amanda Peet, Michael Vartan and Peter Facinelli, and was an Official Selection. President's Choice, of the 2017 edition of The Toronto International Film Festival.

At the beginning of 2005, Sims became the co-manager of Anouk, an EMI-Virgin Records recording artist. He was a witness in Phil Spector's murder trial. He also has started the company Vesuvio Entertainment Corporation which is a distribution company involved in the US theatrical, home entertainment (DVD/video) and television markets, as well as all foreign markets, while at the same time creating synergy with the company's endeavors in the music world. The first film produced by Vesuvio Entertainment was the psychological thriller Behind Your Eyes in (2011), which won two film festival awards and was released on DVD on Redbox on March 20, 2012. In 2013, Vesuvio Entertainment acquired the international distribution rights for the critically acclaimed Craigslist Joe, executive produced by Zach Galifianakis, a film about a man who travels around the country, dependent entirely on connections he makes through Craigslist. In February 2013, Sims became the manager for Martha Davis and The Motels. The Motels first came to prominence in the '80s with the Top Ten hits "Only The Lonely" and "Suddenly Last Summer."

In 2105, Sims and Vesuvio entered into a distribution agreement for the controversial documentary "An Open Secret," directed by Amy Berg, who was Oscar nominated for "Deliver Us From Evil."  Sims in turn partnered with Rocky Mountain Pictures to distribute the film theatrically in the US, though Sims opted to terminate the overall distribution arrangement  saying in a Nov 11, 2015 Huffington Post interview “There were many complex moving parts to this film, most of which predated my involvement, and for several reasons, I made a decision to not expand Vesuvio’s distribution of this film beyond the initial US theatrical co-distribution deal that I had put in place with Rocky Mountain Pictures.”

In August 2016, The Hollywood Reporter announced that Sims had set up a new management division, Arya Artist Management, and had signed Olympic diving legend Greg Louganis

In 2018, Sims, through Arya Worldwide Entertainment, handled theatrical distribution of the multiple award winning indie film "The Divide," which was the directorial debut of veteran actor Perry King. In 2019, the film won Best Picture for premiere western Cowboys and Indians Magazine's annual C&I Movie Awards, and Best Actor for King.

In January 2019, Sims and Arya signed singer/songwriter Evan Henzi for personal management.  Henzi, who appeared on Dr. Oz to discuss his experience as a survivor of sexual abuse, is the co-writer, with Gary Lightbody and Johnny McDaid of Snow Patrol, on "Gareth Emery feat. Evan Henzi, Call to Arms," an electronic track distributed by Armada Music.

References

External links

Vesuvio Entertainment Corporation Backup Information
Report on Greg H. Sims being a key witness in the Phil Spector trial
Another link reporting Greg H. Sims as a key witness in the Phil Spector trial

American male screenwriters
American film producers
Living people
Year of birth missing (living people)